John Heath (later John Duke) (c.1717–1775), of Gittisham, near Honiton, Devon, was an English politician.

He was a Member (MP) of the Parliament of Great Britain for Honiton 1747–1754 and 1761–1768.

He changed his surname from Heath to Duke by a 1750 Act of Parliament, as a condition of the will of his uncle Richard Duke (Richard VII Duke), at which point he inherited the Manor of Otterton in Devon.

He died on 3 November 1775 without any children, and the Duke estates passed to Robert Duke of Otterton, another nephew of Richard Duke.

References

1717 births
1775 deaths
Members of the Parliament of Great Britain for Honiton
British MPs 1747–1754
British MPs 1761–1768